"The Orange Maid of Sligo" is a traditional Irish song dating from the nineteenth century. It is associated with Irish Loyalism, although it is not overtly political in tone.

References

Bibliography
 Cooper, David. The Musical Traditions of Northern Ireland and Its Diaspora: Community and Conflict. Ashgate Publishing, 2010.

Irish songs
Year of song unknown
19th-century songs